(), meaning The Epistle of Forgiveness, is a satirical work of Arabic poetry written by Abu al-ʿAlaʾ al-Maʿarri around 1033 CE. It has been claimed that the  has had an influence on, or has even inspired, Dante Alighieri's Divine Comedy.

Context
The work is a response to a letter sent to al-Maʿarri by a self-righteous grammarian and traditionist, ʿAlī ibn Manṣūr al-Ḥalabī, known as Ibn al-Qāriḥ. In the words of Suzanne Pinckney Stetkevych,
In his epistle, Ibn al-Qāriḥ sanctimoniously flaunts his own learning and orthodoxy by impugning a number of poets and scholars for being s, or heretics. He thereby insinuates a challenge to the religious beliefs of al-Maʿarrī, who expressed in his poetry ideas considered heretical by many. Al-Maʿarrī takes up this challenge in his response, by presenting a tour de force of his own extraordinary learning, and further by offering an imaginary and derisive depiction of Ibn al-Qāriḥ in the Islamic afterworld. There, Ibn al-Qāriḥ is repeatedly taken by surprise at the mercy of the Almighty, as he discovers in the heavenly garden poets and men of letters that he himself had condemned as unbelievers. Hence the title of al-Maʿarrī’s epistle and its abiding message: that man should not presume to limit God’s mercy.

In a mixed timeline of events, the story starts with Ibn al-Qāriḥ in heaven. Al-Maʿarri depicts heaven, as described in the Quran, as a place of pleasures. Everything forbidden in life becomes permissible and all desires are fulfilled with God's grace. The story then explains how Ibn al-Qāriḥ was able to enter heaven. While waiting for his judgement outside the realm of heaven Ibn al-Qāriḥ feels nervous about the prospects of his judgement, knowing he has led a life of schmoozing to rich men and bones and sins he decides to write a poem to the guards of heaven. He fails but continues to find ways to evade hell until he manages to get a pardon from the Islamic prophet Muhammad. After going to heaven, Ibn al-Qāriḥ decides to visit hell. He finds it to be filled with the greatest of Arab poets. He returns to heaven and there he finds Adam. He asks Adam if he truly said "we are created from earth and shall return to earth". Adam says no.

Editions and translations
 آمرزش؛ ترجمه عبدالمحمد آیتی (The Epistle of Forgiveness, translated by Abdul Mohammad Ayati)  2nd ed. (Tehran: Ashrafi Publications, 1357)
 رساله الغفران (The Epistle of Forgiveness)  Translated by Haidar Shojaei. 1st ed. (Tehran: Majd Scientific and Cultural Association, 1379)
 Reynold A. Nicholson, 'The Risālatu’l-Ghufrān by Abū’l-ʿAlāʾ al-Maʿarrī, Summarized and Partially translated', Journal of the Royal Asiatic Society (1900), 637-720; (1902), 75-101, 337-62, 813-47.
 Risālat al-Ghufrān li-Abī al-ʿAlāʾ al-Maʿarrī, ed. by ʿĀʾishah ʿAbd al-Raḥmān [Bint al-Shāṭiʾ], 7th edn (Cairo: Dār al-Maʿārif, 1981) [first edn 1950].
 L’Épître du pardon, trans. by Vincent-Mansour Monteil (Paris: Gallimard, 1984).
 Abū al-ʿAlāʾ al-Maʿarrī, Paradies und Hölle: Die Jenseitsreise aus dem “Sendschreiben über die Vergebung”, trans. by Gregor Schoeler (München: Beck, 2002).
 Abū l-ʿAlāʾ al-Maʿarrī, The Epistle of Forgiveness. Volume One: A Vision of Heaven and Hell Preceded by Ibn al-Qāriḥ’s Epistle, ed. and trans. by Geert Jan van Gelder and Gregor Schoeler (New York: New York University Press, 2013).
 Abū l-ʿAlāʾ al-Maʿarrī, The Epistle of Forgiveness, Volume Two: Or, a Pardon to Enter the Garden: Hypocrites, Heretics, and Other Sinners trans. by Geert Jan Van Gelder and Gregor Schoeler. (New York University Press 2014).
 Suzanne Pinckney Stetkevych, 'The Snake in the Tree in Abu al-ʿAlaʾ al-Maʿarri’s Epistle of Forgiveness: Critical Essay and Translation', Journal of Arabic Literature, 45 (2014), 1-80.

See also 
Arabic literature
Saqt az-Zand
Luzūmiyyāt

References 

1033 works
1030s books
11th-century Arabic books
11th-century poems
Medieval Arabic literature
Syrian literature
Satirical poems
Fiction about the afterlife